Ningbo University of Technology is a comprehensive provincial university located in Ningbo, Zhejiang province of the People's Republic of China.

Location
The university covers an area of 428 015.77 square meters, of which  204,000 square meters consist of buildings space.  A new campus is being built and that covers an area of 914 791.894 square meters.

It is currently in Jiangbei District.

It was formerly in Haishu District.

History
The university was established in 1983 as Ningbo College. In 1997, the university was approved by the Chinese Education Ministry to receive the status of National Exemplary Engineering College.

It also gained further accreditation by the Ministry of Education in 2004 as a full-time university providing four-year undergraduate programmes. Presently the university has a faculty of approximately 700 staff. This include 41 professors and 133 associate professors. There is approximately 8000 full-time students.

Related Incident 

 Murder of Chen Shijun

References

External links
Ningbo University of Technology 

Universities and colleges in Zhejiang
Education in Ningbo
Educational institutions established in 1983
1983 establishments in China